Postman Pat is a British stop-motion animated television series first produced by Woodland Animations. The series follows the adventures of Pat Clifton, a postman who works for Royal Mail postal service in the fictional village of Greendale (inspired by the real valley of Longsleddale near Kendal).

Postman Pat first 13-episode series was screened on BBC One in 1981. John Cunliffe wrote the original treatment and scripts for the series, which was directed by animator Ivor Wood, who also worked on The Magic Roundabout, The Wombles, Paddington, and The Herbs. Following the success of the first series, four TV specials and a second series of 13 episodes were produced during the 1990s. In this series, Pat had a family shown on screen for the first time (though his wife had been mentioned in a number of episodes).

A new version of the series was produced by Cosgrove Hall Films from 2003 to 2008 and expanded on many aspects of the original series. The show ended on 29 March 2017, after 8 series and 12 specials. Reruns of this series continue to air on CBeebies on the weekends.

Plot
Each episode follows the adventures of Patrick Clifton, a friendly country postman, and his black and white cat Jess, as he delivers the post through the valley of Greendale. Although he initially concentrates on delivering his letters, he nearly always becomes distracted by a concern of one of the villagers, and is always keen to help resolve their problems. Notable villagers include the postmistress, Mrs. Goggins; farmer couple Alf and Dorothy Thompson; the Reverend Timms; PC Selby, the police constable; Jeff Pringle, the school teacher; Peter Fogg, a farm hand; George Lancaster, a chicken farmer; Miss Hubbard, an upper-class woman; Julia Pottage, who runs Greendale Farm and Ted Glen, the local handyman and inventor.

Setting
Postman Pat is set in the fictional village of Greendale and the nearby town of Pencaster, on the border between Cumbria and North Yorkshire.

Greendale has a different character in the various Postman Pat series. In the original series (1 and 2), it was a small village with narrow, winding roads. The gentle pace of life allowed Pat plenty of time to enjoy the countryside as he passed through, or even stop on quiet days to have a picnic.

In the more recent series, Greendale became a big, busy village situated in the heart of the Cumbrian countryside. Running through the centre of the village is the High Street, home to Mrs Goggins's Post Office and shop, an unofficial meeting place for residents. Located on the edge of the village is the railway station, home to the Greendale Rocket. Nisha Bains runs a popular café there with Sara while her husband Ajay runs a regular schedule on the Greendale Rocket to the nearby town of Pencaster.

In the second series of the show, which aired in 1996, the village at the centre of the series was briefly referred to as Garner Bridge, while Greendale was the name of the valley in which Garner Bridge was situated. In the episode Postman Pat and the Suit of Armour, Greendale Post Office is referred to as "Garner Bridge Post Office".

Pencaster is a large, bustling, modern town located within easy commuting distance for the villagers of Greendale. Situated on the waterfront, Pencaster is a hive of activity, boasting a market square in the centre surrounded by shops, houses, a large railway station, state-of-the-art buildings, and a boat jetty. It bears some resemblance to Lancaster, the county town of Lancashire, which likewise is a short commute from Longsleddale, the area used as the inspiration for Greendale.

Ingledale is another large, busy village town situated in the heart of the North Yorkshire countryside, only seen once in a special in 1991, set to make a second appearance in the revival.

Inspiration
Cunliffe, interviewed about the series, has said that he chose the character of a postman since he needed a character who could visit the countryside and interact with many different people.

The inspiration for the post office itself comes from one located on the street in Kendal where Cunliffe lived when he was writing the original treatment. The post office, at 10 Greenside, closed in 2003.

Cunliffe didn't retain rights to the character and was criticised by some of the tie-in media later released. He wrote the stories to the series Rosie and Jim, which he also presented, as a show which he could have more creative control over.

While Cunliffe visited post offices for inspiration, he has said that the character and village was not based on any one place or person. He commented in 2015 that "I got maybe half a dozen people last year saying they were the inspiration."

Cast
In Series 1, Ken Barrie voiced all the characters and narrated the series. In Series 2, Carole Boyd joined to voice all the female characters and child characters except Granny Dryden who was still voiced by Barrie. In Series 3, Kulvinder Ghir, Janet James, and Archie Panjabi joined to voice the new characters and the child characters, while Boyd continued to voice the adult females, Charlie and Sarah, Melissa Sinden and Jimmy Hibbert also joined to perform the animal characters' vocal effects and Angela Griffin joined in Series 5 to voice a new character. In Series 6, Lewis MacLeod replaced Barrie as Pat. In Series 7, Barrie left completely and MacLeod, Bradley Clarkson, and Dan Milne took over the rest of Barrie's characters. Joe Trill joined in Series 8 to voice a new character.

 Lewis MacLeod as Patrick "Pat" Clifton (series 6-8), Ben Taylor, Robot 1, Sat Nav, Alf Thompson (series 7-8), Sean McGuinness
 Ken Barrie as Patrick "Pat" Clifton (series 1–5), Matt Clifton, Mrs Goggins (series 1), Ted Glen (series 1–6), Alf Thompson (series 1–6), Dorothy Thompson (series 1), Bill Thompson (series 1), Reverend Peter Timms (series 1–6), Julia Pottage (series 1), Katy Pottage (series 1), Tom Pottage (series 1), PC Arthur Selby (series 2–6), Lucy Selby (series 1), Sylvia Gilbertson (series 1), Sarah Gilbertson (series 1), Jeff Pringle, Charlie Pringle (series 1), Rebecca Hubbard (series 1), Sam Waldron, Granny Dryden, Peter Fogg, Major Forbes, George Lancaster, Santa Claus, Train Inspector, Pumpkin Wrigglesworth, Narrator, Radio Greendale Speaker, John, George, Countdown Sequence Voice
 Carole Boyd as Sara Clifton, Julian Clifton (series 2), Mrs. Goggins (series 2-present), Dorothy Thompson (series 2-present), Bill Thompson (series 2), Julia Pottage (series 2–5), Katy Pottage (series 2), Tom Pottage (series 2), Betty Pottage, Lucy Selby (series 2), Sylvia Gilbertson (series 2-8), Sarah Gilbertson (series 2-8), Jackie Gilbertson, Charlie Pringle (series 2-8), Rebecca Hubbard (series 2), George's Wife, Radio Weather Woman
 Kulvinder Ghir as Bill Thompson (series 3-8), Tom Pottage (series 3–5), Ajay Bains, Bessie Thompson, Michael Lam, Robot 2, Grizzly, Shopper-Bot 3000
 Janet James as Julian Clifton (series 3-8), Lucy Selby (series 3-8), Lauren Taylor
 Archie Panjabi as Katy Pottage (series 3–5), Nisha Bains, Meera Bains
 Melissa Sinden as Jess Clifton, Polly Clifton, Dotty Pringle, Bonnie Goggins
 Angela Griffin as Amy Wrigglesworth, Lizzy Taylor, Flora, Rowena Roberts, Duchess of Pencaster
 Bradley Clarkson as Ted Glen (series 7-8), Arthur Selby (series 7-8), Ned Glen
 Dan Milne as Reverend Peter Timms (series 7-8)
 Joel Trill as Chris Beacon
 Professor Brian Cox as Professor Ryan Farrow (Guest star)

Characters

Postman Pat: Special Delivery Service
In the spin-off series, Postman Pat: Special Delivery Service, Postman Pat has been promoted to Head of the SDS and is now called upon to deliver anything. Each episode follows Postman Pat on a Special Delivery mission, from rescuing a runaway cow to delivering a giant ice cube. In his new role, Postman Pat commutes to the nearby town of Pencaster where he collects his special deliveries from the Pencaster Mail Centre. Postman Pat now has a newer fleet of vehicles including a bigger van, gyrocopter, 4x4 Jeep and motorbike, complete with side-car for Jess. He has a new boss, Ben, who tends to give him instructions (whereas he was his own master before the "promotion"). Pat also seems to make more mistakes in his work since moving to SDS, largely because the new format is always based on one delivery, which has to go wrong somehow (thus often because of Pat's errors).

The series features an expanded and diverse cast, a fleet of new vehicles, a world full of gadgets and the new town of Pencaster. Postman Pat: Special Delivery Service first screened on BBC2 on 29 September 2008. The new series was commissioned by the BBC and produced by Entertainment Rights and Cosgrove Hall Films.

A new series aired in 2016.

Episodes

Outside the main broadcast series

Film

Postman Pat: The Movie, a British-American 3D computer-animated comedy children's feature film version of the British stop-motion animated children's television show, was theatrically released on 23 May 2014 in the United Kingdom. The film was distributed and produced by Lionsgate and Icon Productions and animated by Rubicon Group Holding. The story revolves around Pat entering a talent show audition which leads to robots taking over his postal service whilst he is away. The film stars Stephen Mangan as the voice of Pat and also features Jim Broadbent, Rupert Grint, David Tennant, Ronan Keating (as Pat's singing voice), Susan Duerden, Sandra Teles, TJ Ramini and Peter Woodward.

Spin-off

A CGI spin-off to the series was made called Guess with Jess which follows Pat's cat Jess now with the ability to talk and his adventures with the farm animals. The series debuted on 9 November 2009 and ended in 2013.

Music
Music for the original 1981 series was by Bryan Daly, who wrote a number of songs including the well-known theme tune. For the 2003 series, pop writer Simon Woodgate scored the show and wrote new songs, including a new closing theme "What's in His Bag?". The theme tune "Postman Pat & His Black and White Cat" was sung by Ken Barrie for the original series in the 1980s and '90s. An extended version of the tune was released as a single in the UK where it reached number 44 in the charts in July 1982.

The theme tune and songs for Postman Pat Special Delivery Service (including "Special Delivery Service, What's It Going to Be Today?"), was recorded by Simon Woodgate at Echobass Studios.

In 2013, DreamWorks Classics released Postman Pat SDS series 2. The new 26-episode series retained Bryan Daly's original theme tune and Simon Woodgate's closing song, however new character themes and incidental music was composed by Sandy Nuttgens.

There is also an album called Postman Pat: Songs and Music From the TV Series, released by Post Music in 1982.

The theme song has undergone several adaptations; from 1994 to 2006, the theme tune had additional instruments such as synthesised strings and a tambourine. A similar edit had already been made to the 1993 album version, which was an edit of the original 1982 album version.

Books
As of 2009, over 12 million books, including storybooks, integrated learning books, colouring books, and multi-character magazines, have been sold worldwide.

Advertising
The Postman Pat characters and setting have also been used in the UK and Australia in television advertisements for the company Specsavers.

Home media

DVD and VHS releases

United Kingdom
VHS and Betamax releases of Series 1 were originally released by Longman Video in the early-80s, before BBC Enterprises/Worldwide secured them, and later released Series 2 on VHS. for Series 1, the original opening titles which featured Pat driving in the original version of his van with a crown logo (which Pat used until Pat's Thirsty Day) was replaced with an edited version of the shot for shot remake of the original intro (which had Pat driving the Royal Mail Van) as used when the show aired in countries like France and Australia. The edits made to the intro on the DVD involved some shots being replaced by scenes from "Pat's Difficult Day", "Pat Takes A Message", and "Pat's Foggy Day". This edited intro was also used when CBeebies reran the show.

After the sale of Woodland Animations to Entertainment Rights, the company began releasing VHS and DVDs of the revival series through their video label Right Entertainment and distributor Universal Pictures Video. Right released only one classic series volume on VHS and DVD - Postman Pat in a Muddle in April 2004, which contained three Series 2 episodes.

While no further classic series releases were seen in the UK until 2011, Universal and Classic Media issued all four specials from 1991 to 1994 on the DVD Happy Birthday Postman Pat. On 3 February 2014, the first and second series were made available in their entirety for the first time in the UK, However, the titles are both season 2 with the season 3 theme which came under scrutiny from classic fans and also credits Carole Boyd as doing voices in series 1, despite it being only Ken Barrie at the time.

International
DVD releases of classic Postman Pat were limited in availability in various regions, although the revival series is more common.

In 2004, the entire original series was released on DVD in Spain, featuring both English and Spanish audio options.

Other versions
Scotland did not only show it in English but also sometimes broadcast as Pàdraig Post, in the Gaelic language, on BBC Scotland.

Postman Pat Village at Longleat
Longleat Safari Park had an outdoor reproduction of Greendale village, including the Post Office, the Cliftons' house and the Greendale station. It also had a miniature model of Greendale. It was installed during the 1990s, was relocated during 2008 in preparation for a new animal area and was revamped a third time for 2013. The attraction was closed at the end of 2015 and was permanently removed in 2016.

Award nominations
In 2006, Postman Pat was nominated for "Best Pre-school Animation" at the BAFTA Children's Awards.

Parodies
Harry Enfield and Chums featured a parody entitled "Il Postino Pat" (the show's Italian title), with an operatic reworking of the theme tune and the characters speaking in Italian. At the end, there is a communist revolution in Greendale, and Pat is shot and killed by fascist soldiers.
 Harry and Paul parodied Postman Pat in series 3 and 4 with "Parking Pataweyo", an African immigrant working as a stereotypically uncompromising traffic warden, played by Daniel Kaluuya, whose name and theme tune are based on Pat's.

In 1987, Spitting Image, the topical satirical puppet series, featured "Temporary Postman Pratt" in a send-up of Royal Mail's employment of temporary postal workers during busy times. In the opening titles, Pratt can be seen driving a familiar (though yellow in colour) van along country roads before running over a black and white cat. Pratt likes to clear his workload as quickly as he can by dumping the post rather than delivering it. He is portrayed as a student who is lazy and rude. The segment was animated by Aardman Animations.
 In 1986, an episode of Bobby Davro on the Box featured Postman Pete, in which the cast members dressed as the characters, along with their names, such as Granny Wisden and Fred Ben. The segment was narrated by the original series narrator, Ken Barrie.

In the round Scenes We'd Like to See on Mock the Week, series 15 episode 3, entitled Things you Wouldn't Hear on a Kids' TV Show, Miles Jupp recorded the following parodied lines: "Yodel delivery driver Pat, Yodel delivery driver Pat / He's thrown your parcel in a hedge".

References

External links

 
 

1980s British animated television series
1980s British children's television series
1981 British television series debuts
1990s British animated television series
1990s British children's television series
2000s British animated television series
2000s British children's television series
2000s preschool education television series
2010s British animated television series
2010s British children's television series
2017 British television series endings
British children's animated adventure television series
British television shows based on children's books
BBC children's television shows
DreamWorks Classics
DreamWorks Classics franchises
HIT Entertainment
English-language television shows
Fictional British postal workers
Mass media franchises
Television shows adapted into films
Television shows adapted into novels
Television series by Universal Television
Television series by Cosgrove Hall Films
Television shows set in Cumbria
Television shows set in England
Television characters introduced in 1981
CBeebies
British television series revived after cancellation